The William Park House is a historic house at 330 Main St. in Sprague, Connecticut.  Built in 1913, it is a prominent local example of an American Foursquare house with Craftsman/Bungalow features.  It was built for William Park, owner of the Angus Park Woolen Company, a major local employer.  The house was listed on the National Register of Historic Places in 2007.

Description and history
The William Park House is located in the mill village of Hanover, on a  parcel bounded by Main, Spruce, and Pearl Streets. It is a -story wood-frame structure, roughly rectangular in shape, with a wraparound porch and porte cochere.  It is covered by a hip roof, obscured somewhat by large dormers that have broad bands of windows with either gabled or gable-on-hip rooflines.  The walls are finished in stucco and half-timbering.  Most windows are sash, with a multilight top sash and a single-pane lower sash, a distinctive Prairie School touch.  The interior retains high quality woodwork and carved plasterwork, including staircase balustrades and builtin cabinetry.

The house was built in 1913 by Peck McWilliams, a master builder who may also have been responsible for its design.  The American Foursquare, particularly with clear Prairie School features, is not commonly found in Connecticut, and this is a particularly high quality example of the form.  It was built for William Park, the son of Angus Park, founder of the Angus Park Woolen Company.  The elder Park had founded the business in 1899, buying an old textile mill and upgrading its infrastructure.  Under William Park and his son (also named Angus), that business would surviving until 1970.

See also
National Register of Historic Places listings in New London County, Connecticut

References

Houses on the National Register of Historic Places in Connecticut
Prairie School architecture in Connecticut
Houses completed in 1913
Houses in New London County, Connecticut
Sprague, Connecticut
National Register of Historic Places in New London County, Connecticut
1913 establishments in Connecticut